Lake County Sheriff's House and Jail, also known as the Sheriff's House, is a historic jail and residence located at 226 South Main Street in Crown Point, Lake County, Indiana. It was built in 1882, and is a two-story, Second Empire style brick building. It has a three-story projecting tower and a mansard roof.  It features a one-story, flat roofed porch with Tuscan order columns added about 1890. The building remained in use as a residence until 1958 and as a jail until 1974. The building is maintained and open to the public by the Old Sheriff's House Foundation.

It was added to the National Register of Historic Places on January 4, 1989. It is part of the Crown Point Courthouse Square Historic District.

References

External links
Old Sheriff's House Foundation website

Jails on the National Register of Historic Places in Indiana
Houses on the National Register of Historic Places in Indiana
Second Empire architecture in Indiana
Government buildings completed in 1882
Houses completed in 1882
Buildings and structures in Lake County, Indiana
National Register of Historic Places in Lake County, Indiana
Individually listed contributing properties to historic districts on the National Register in Indiana
Jails in Indiana
1882 establishments in Indiana